Robert Patrick Webb (born 29 September 1972) is an English comedian, actor, writer, and television personality. He is one half of the double act Mitchell and Webb, alongside David Mitchell. Webb and Mitchell both starred in the Channel 4 sitcom Peep Show, in which Webb plays Jeremy "Jez" Usbourne. The two also starred in the sketch comedy programme That Mitchell and Webb Look, for which they then performed a stage adaption, The Two Faces of Mitchell and Webb. The duo starred in the 2007 film Magicians, and in the short-lived series Ambassadors. Webb headed the critically acclaimed sitcom The Smoking Room and was a performer in the sketch show Bruiser. Since 2017, he has starred alongside Mitchell in the Channel 4 comedy-drama Back.

Webb is also a regular comedy panelist, appearing on television shows, such as The Bubble, Have I Got News for You, Never Mind the Buzzcocks, QI, Mastermind, Was It Something I Said, and Argumental. He has also hosted and narrated several programmes. His other sitcom appearances include Blessed, The Bleak Old Shop of Stuff and Fresh Meat.

Early life
Born in Boston, Lincolnshire, Webb grew up in Woodhall Spa near Horncastle. His parents divorced when he was aged five, with his mother remarrying a year or so later. He has two elder brothers and a younger half-sister. He grew up on a council estate, and was educated at Queen Elizabeth's Grammar School in Horncastle. Having grown up watching the sitcoms The Young Ones, Blackadder, and Only Fools and Horses, he became interested in drama and poetry while in school, and began writing parodies. At the age of 13, partly because of resentment towards his father, he chose to lose his Lincolnshire accent.

When Webb was 17 and in the lower sixth form preparing for his A-levels, his mother died of breast cancer, and he moved in with his father and re-sat his A-levels.

In 1992, Webb attended Robinson College, Cambridge, where he studied English and became vice-president of the Footlights, where he met David Mitchell. The two met at an audition for a Footlights production of Cinderella in 1993.

Career

Mitchell and Webb
The two put together their first project, a show about World War I titled Innocent Millions Dead or Dying – A Wry Look at the Post-Apocalyptic Age (With Songs), in January 1995. Webb later described it as being "fucking terrible". From this the duo were given the chance to write for Alexander Armstrong and Ben Miller, and for series two of Big Train. After minor work on The Jack Docherty Show and Comedy Nation, their first break into television acting was in 2000, on the short-lived BBC sketch show Bruiser, which they primarily wrote, and starred in.

In 2001, the duo were commissioned for a sketch show of their own, entitled The Mitchell and Webb Situation, which ran for six episodes on the now defunct channel Play UK. Mitchell and Webb's next project came in 2003, with starring roles in the Channel 4 sitcom Peep Show, as flatmates Mark Corrigan and Jeremy "Jez" Usbourne respectively. The pair shared the 2007 Royal Television Society Award for "Comedy Performance", and were jointly nominated for Best Television Comedy Actor at the 2006 British Comedy Awards. Webb was nominated for the Best Television Comedy Actor award again, this time without Mitchell, in 2009. Peep Show ran for nine series, making it the longest-running sitcom in Channel 4 history.

After the success of Peep Show, Mitchell and Webb returned to sketch comedy with their BBC Radio 4 sketch show That Mitchell and Webb Sound, which ran for five series. The show was adapted for television and became That Mitchell and Webb Look; producer Gareth Edwards described it as "the shortest pitch (he had) ever written". Towards the end of 2006 the pair made their first tour, with a show called The Two Faces of Mitchell and Webb. The tour was criticised as just "a succession of largely unrelated scenes" by The Guardians Brian Logan, who gave it a rating of two stars.

That Mitchell and Webb Look won them the BAFTA for "Best Comedy Programme or Series" at the 2007 awards, and they earned a further nomination for it in 2009. It was nominated for two British Comedy awards in 2006: "Britain's Best New TV Comedy" and the "Highland Spring People's Choice". Their stage tour The Two Faces of Mitchell and Webb was nominated for the British Comedy Award for "Best Stage Comedy", and That Mitchell and Webb Sound won a Sony Silver Award. Their first film, Magicians, was released on 18 May 2007. It was directed by Andrew O'Connor and written by Jesse Armstrong and Sam Bain. Webb played the role of modern magician Karl.

They filmed Playing Shop, a comedy television pilot for BBC2 about two men who operate a business out of their shed, which they also wrote. Although the BBC were happy with it, Mitchell and Webb scrapped it themselves, as they felt it was too similar to Peep Show. A new pilot had been commissioned, but the plan was later shelved.

The duo fronted the campaign of the UK version of Apple Inc.'s Get a Mac adverts, with Mitchell playing a PC. The adverts proved controversial. Writing in The Guardian, Charlie Brooker claimed that the use of Mitchell and Webb in the adverts was a curious choice. He compared the characters of PC and Mac in the adverts to those of Mark and Jeremy in Peep Show, stating that "when you see the ads, you think, 'PCs are a bit rubbish yet ultimately lovable, whereas Macs are just smug, preening tossers.'" The British Sitcom Guide criticised the pair for "selling their souls". One journalist called the adverts "worse than not funny", and accused Mitchell and Webb of "an act of grave betrayal" for taking corporate work. In an interview with The Telegraph, Webb responded to the critics of the Apple adverts, stating that "when someone asks, 'Do you want to do some funny ads for not many days in the year and be paid more than you would be for an entire series of Peep Show?' the answer, obviously, is, 'Yeah, that's fine'". In the same interview, Mitchell also said "I don't see what is morally inconsistent with a comedian doing an advert. It's alright to sell computers, isn't it? Unless you think that capitalism is evil – which I don't. It's not like we're helping to flog a baby-killing machine".

Solo work
Webb has appeared in two series of the BBC Three sitcom The Smoking Room (2004) and the Radio 4 sketch show Concrete Cow. In 2005 he appeared in the Ben Elton-scripted BBC One sitcom Blessed as Ardal O'Hanlon's 'perfect' counterpart.

He and Olivia Colman also featured as a naturist couple in Confetti, a 2006 film about a competition for the most original wedding. Webb has since said that he believed that his genitals would be pixellated out but only discovered at the screening of the film that they were not. Also in 2008, Webb made his West End stage debut in the UK premiere of Neil LaBute's Fat Pig.

Webb won the 2009 series Let's Dance for the charity Comic Relief, parodying the audition sequence from the film Flashdance. He narrated the series Young, Dumb and Living Off Mum. He hosted a 2010 Channel 4 series looking at the week's online news, Robert's Web.

He has appeared on several panel shows, including Have I Got News for You, Never Mind the Buzzcocks and QI. In January 2011, Webb appeared on a celebrity version of BBC quiz Mastermind, answering nine questions correctly on his specialist subject (the novels of Ian McEwan) and 11 correctly on the general knowledge round. In 2011 Webb played Dan, a geology lecturer, in the Channel 4 series Fresh Meat. Later that year, he was cast in the costume comedy The Bleak Old Shop of Stuff, a parody of Charles Dickens' works. Since 2011, Webb has replaced Rufus Hound as team captain on the BBC comedy panel show Argumental.

Webb was the narrator of Channel 5's anti-nostalgia series 10 Things I Hate About, which began on 16 April 2012. In each episode, Webb presented his opinion on the awful aspects of a particular year (1995, 1990, 1987, and 1999).

In 2011 Webb presented "Groundbreaking Gags" on BBC Three, in which he looked at the significant gags for which that the animated show Family Guy has been recognised.

From December 2012 Webb featured in adverts for comparethemarket.com, as its founder Maurice Wigglethorpe-Throom.

From September 2021 Webb was a contestant in the nineteenth series of Strictly Come Dancing, partnered with professional dancer Dianne Buswell. The couple completed three dances and were in 11th place, when Webb withdrew on 13 October, due to his heart condition. He said he had an urgent consultation with his heart specialist, after experiencing symptoms, and that she had recommended he pull out of the competition. Webb said he was "extremely sorry" to have to leave, adding: "It became clear that I had bitten off way more than I could chew for this stage in my recovery."

Writing
Together with Mitchell, Webb published his first comedy book This Mitchell and Webb Book, which was released in the UK and the US in 2009 by HarperCollins imprint Fourth Estate. An abridged edition of highlights from This Mitchell and Webb Book, entitled How to Cope with Mitchell and Webb, was released only in the UK on 1 October 2009. The pair signed a two-book deal with Fourth Estate but, as of November 2013, a second book remained unpublished.

Webb wrote articles for the comments pages of the Telegraph newspaper between 2009 and 2011. He criticised those who commented on the online versions of his articles in a New Statesman piece. In a 2013 interview, Webb explained his experience with the publication:

Webb thinks it is harmful for men to 'keep a stiff upper lip' and hide their feelings.

In 2015, Webb began writing his first solo memoir, How Not to Be a Boy, on growing up in working class Lincolnshire. The memoir was released in August 2017. A spoken-word adaptation, read by Webb, was featured as BBC Radio 4's Book of the Week to coincide with the launch.

In 2020, Canongate published Webb's first novel, Come Again.

Personal life
Webb married fellow comedy performer Abigail Burdess in 2006, who he worked with on the BBC2 comedy show The Bleak Old Shop of Stuff. David Mitchell was the best man at the wedding ceremony. They live in West Hampstead, London, and have two daughters. In his 2017 memoir How Not to Be a Boy, he talked about his bisexuality.

In a 2008 Independent piece, Webb explained that he was a "swaggering atheist" prior to the death of his mother, but that the loss led to him starting to pray. Upon reflection, however, Webb stated that his temporary departure from atheism was a coping mechanism for the loss, and after he learned to "co-exist" with his mother's death, he returned to atheism: "... I've returned to total non-belief. I don't know how long it'll last, but God, it's good to be back!"

Following the "sell-out" criticism both Webb and Mitchell received for appearing in an advertisement for Apple Inc. Webb stated in 2008:
I'm not a sell-out ... The problem is that that presupposes a set of principles we don't actually hold. We never said comedians shouldn't do ads, or that we somehow operate outside the mixed market economy ... really we're just doing a job.

In 2020 he underwent emergency surgery on his heart for a mitral valve prolapse after being diagnosed with the condition at a routine medical check. He had attributed the symptoms to excessive alcohol intake, saying: "I just assumed, that's the booze... I thought this is what you feel like when you're 47 and you treat your body like a skip." He then gave up drinking alcohol, saying: "The drinking crawled up so gradually that I was slow-killing myself... It was certainly an addiction at the end, a dependency... I was thinking of [drinking] at any given time of the day."

Media

Webb was the invited guest on the Radio 4 long running series Desert Island Discs, hosted by Lauren Laverne in March 2023.

Politics 
In August 2014, Webb was one of 200 public figures who were signatories to a letter to The Guardian expressing their hope that Scotland would vote to remain part of the United Kingdom in September's referendum on that issue.

Webb was a staunch supporter of the Labour Party, and joined the party in 2013, in response to Russell Brand's interview on Newsnight, in which he suggested people should not vote as a form of protest.

By November 2015, he announced on Twitter that he was leaving the Labour Party, citing his lack of confidence in the party's leader, Jeremy Corbyn. He also expressed his disapproval at the appointment of Guardian journalist Seumas Milne as Labour's press secretary. He was quoted as saying that paying his party subscription with Milne in post made him "feel sick".

However, in May 2017, Webb endorsed the Labour Party in the 2017 UK general election.

In December 2018, Webb tweeted his support of an article by Janice Turner in which she criticised Mermaids – a charity which supports transgender children and their families – that had sought (and was eventually awarded) a £500,000 UK National Lottery grant. He also identified himself as a gender-critical feminist, but claimed to oppose transphobia. He stood by the comments in a 2020 interview with The Sunday Times.  In a 2021 interview with Jesse Thorn on the NPR show Bullseye, Webb said that his criticism of Mermaids should not be confused with an opposition to supporting transgender children, and that the debate around gender-nonconforming children had become overheated. When asked about what his opposition to Mermaids was he declined to elaborate further, stating he could no longer remember the specifics. Webb has been criticised by some LGBT news outlets, charities and activists for this stance.

Filmography

Film

Television

Bibliography

Non-fiction 
How Not to Be a Boy (Canongate Books, 2017)

Fiction 
Come Again (Canongate Books, 2020)

Other work 
Webb has appeared on a number of podcasts including The QuaranTea Break Podcast with Simon Ward and The Two Shot Podcast.

References

External links

 

1972 births
Living people
20th-century English male actors
21st-century English male actors
20th-century English writers
21st-century English writers
Alumni of Robinson College, Cambridge
Apple Inc. advertising
Bisexual male actors
Comedians from Lincolnshire
English autobiographers
English male comedians
English male film actors
English male stage actors
English male television actors
English television producers
English television writers
Labour Party (UK) people
English LGBT actors
English LGBT writers
Male actors from Lincolnshire
Male feminists
People educated at Queen Elizabeth's Grammar School, Horncastle
People from Woodhall Spa
Television personalities from Lincolnshire
People from Boston, Lincolnshire
British male comedy actors
British male television writers